Mark David Reed (born February 21, 1959) is a former American football quarterback in the National Football League (NFL) who played for the Baltimore Colts. He played college football for the Moorhead State Dragons.

References

1959 births
Living people
American football quarterbacks
New York Giants players
Baltimore Colts players
Minnesota State–Moorhead Dragons football players